Taylor Bevan (born 17 January 2001) is a Welsh boxer. He participated at the 2022 Commonwealth Games in the boxing competition, being awarded the silver medal in the men's light heavyweight event. His father is Lester Bevan. His mother is Katie Holmes, from whom he qualifies for Welsh Nationality. He is also the brother of Owen Bevan who is a footballer in the AFC Bournemouth Development Squad.

References

External links 

Living people
2001 births
Place of birth missing (living people)
Welsh male boxers
Boxers at the 2022 Commonwealth Games
Commonwealth Games silver medallists for Wales
Commonwealth Games medallists in boxing
Light-heavyweight boxers
21st-century Welsh people
Medallists at the 2022 Commonwealth Games